Wilwerdange is a small town in the commune of Troisvierges, in northern Luxembourg.  , the town has a population of 251.

External links

See more information about Wilwerdange at the website www.wilwerdange.eu/

Towns in Luxembourg
Troisvierges